Robert "Bob" F. Perani (August 7, 1942 – April 15, 2012) was a professional ice hockey goaltender for the Flint Generals in the International Hockey League. He was also the founder of Perani's Hockey World sports retail chain in 1976, and owned the naming rights for the Perani Arena and Event Center. Perani died on April 15, 2012 while traveling on an international flight from Detroit to Tokyo.

Perani was born in Italy in 1942 and moved to Canada with his family in 1953, settling near Toronto. He attended St. Lawrence University where he was a member of Sigma Pi fraternity.  He played for a number of leagues in Michigan and Ontario. He and his wife Kris moved to Flint in the late 1960s and never left. Kris died from cancer in 2006.The following year, as part of the 'Perani Group', he bought the Flint Generals. He retired as a player after the 1974 season and went into the pizza business and in 1976 started "Bob Perani's Sports Shop".

Perani retired to Thailand and died on a flight from Detroit to Tokyo en route to Thailand.

Career

OHA
 Hamilton Tiger Cubs 1959-1960 - 1 game
 Toronto Marlboros 1960-1961 - 3 games
 Whitby Mohawks 1961-1962 - 30 games
ECAC Hockey - Division I (NCAA)
 St. Lawrence University Saints 1963-1966 - 63 games
IHL
 Muskegon Mohawks 1967-1968; 1968-1969 76 games
 Flint Generals 1969-1970; 1970-1974 142 games
AHL
 Springfield Kings 1967-1968, 1968-1969 7 games
OHA Sr
Toronto Marlboros 1967-1968 - 0 games
Barrie Flyers 1969-1970 10 games

Source:

Awards and honors

 James Norris Memorial Trophy - 1968/1969 with teammate Tim Tabor with the Muskegon Mohawks

References

External links

1942 births
2012 deaths
American men's ice hockey goaltenders
American sportspeople of Canadian descent
American people of Italian descent
Canadian people of Italian descent
Flint Generals players
Ice hockey players from Michigan
Ice hockey people from Ontario
Sportspeople from Flint, Michigan
AHCA Division I men's ice hockey All-Americans